Madog ap Gruffudd, or Madog ap Gruffudd Maelor, was Prince of Powys Fadog from 1191 to 1236 in north-east Wales.

Early life 

He was elder son of Prince Gruffydd Maelor and his wife, Angharad, a daughter of King Owain Gwynedd. He succeeded his father jointly with his brother, Owen, in 1191 and on Owen's death in 1197 became the sole ruler of Powys north of the River Rhaeadr and the Afon Tanat.

Madog consolidated the possessions of his father, Prince Gruffudd Maelor, and the territory he ruled became known as Powys Fadog in his honour, the remainder of the old kingdom formed Powys Wenwynwyn. (Fadog is a gender mutation of his name, Madog.) After his death in 1236, this area—comprising Welsh and English Maelor, Ial, Cynllaith, Nanheudwy and Mochnant Is Rhaeadr—was still referred to as Powys Fadog although it was divided up between his five sons.

Madog was close to his cousin, Llywelyn ap Iorwerth, initially, but gradually distanced himself and also kept aloof from 1212 when his cousin had managed to reform the Welsh Confederacy and looked instead to King John of England, in whose pay he was, as an official ally of the English king. By 1215 he decided to ally with his cousin and remained so.

Establishment of and burial at Valle Crucis Abbey 

On 28 January 1201, Madog founded the Cistercian abbey of Valle Crucis Abbey, Llangollen, Wales. The abbey was founded with monks from nearby Strata Marcella abbey. He is buried at Valle Crucis Abbey in the abbey church, as are several of Madog's descendants. The exact site of his burial is unknown.

He is either a great-grandfather or great-great-great-grandfather of Owain Glyndŵr.

Marriage and children 
He had married Esyllt (Isolda). He had issue:

 Gruffudd Maelor II, who succeeded his father,
 Gruffudd Iâl, died 1238
 Maredudd, died 1256
 Hywel, died 1268
 Madog Fychan, died 1269
 Angharad.

References 

1236 deaths
Monarchs of Powys
12th-century Welsh monarchs
13th-century Welsh monarchs
Year of birth unknown
The Lordship of Bromfield and Yale